Mícheál Ó Súilleabháin (10 December 1950 – 7 November 2018) was an Irish musician, composer, academic and educationalist.

Biography 
Mícheál Ó Súilleabháin was a pianist, composer, recording artist and academic; he held the Professorship of Music at the Irish World Academy of Music and Dance which he founded at  the University of Limerick in 1994.
I

His sons Owen Ó Súílleabháin and Mícheál 'Moley' Ó Súílleabháin are well known as singer songwriters and motivational speakers and perform in the Irish pop band Size2shoes. His first wife is Irish chant singer Nóirín Ní Riain, with whom he collaborated in the 1980s on a series of recordings with the Benedictine Monks of Glenstal Abbey.

In a 1995 interview with In Dublin magazine (Vol 20, No 20) he told Damian Corless that he was born into a Clonmel home where "there was no music of any sort. There was a windy-up gramophone and a wireless that came on at lunchtime." At University College Cork he studied under the legendary Sean Ó Riada, who was in rapidly declining health. Ó Súilleabháin attested that his mentor was "suffering a certain amount". But Ó Riada's liberating approach to traditional music left an indelible mark on his pupil, who revealed that he turned his musical limitations into strengths, telling Corless: "I said to myself 'here am I stuck with the wrong instruments for this music that I love. I don't play the pipes or the whistle. I can play the odd tune, but no matter how long I stick with them I'll never master them. I'll always be a piano player.'"

He was awarded an honorary D.Mus from the National University of Ireland at his alma mater University College Cork in 2004. In 2017 he was awarded an honorary DMus from the Royal Scottish Conservatoire. In 2016 he was awarded the Freedom of the Town in his native  Clonmel in Co Tipperary. He recorded extensively with the Irish Chamber Orchestra.

In 1990 he founded the Irish Music Archive at the Burns Library, Boston College. In 2016 he was awarded the O'Donnell Chair of Irish Studies at the University of Notre Dame, Indiana. In 2017 he commenced a series of concerts with the RTE Symphony Orchestra (Ireland) at the National Concert Hall, Dublin, recorded and broadcast by RTE lyric fm (Elver Gleams 2017; Between Worlds 2018).

He was inaugural Chair of 'Culture Ireland' for nine years, the organisation within the Irish Government for the promotion of all Irish arts worldwide. In 2016 he retired from the University of Limerick and was succeeded following international competition by Professor Mel Mercier, Chair of Performing Arts, a long-time musical collaborator.

Working closely with Professor Helen Phelan, his second wife, he established the Irish World Academy in 22 years (1994–2016) from a zero base to some 300 students across c.20 highly innovative postgraduate and undergraduate degree programmes. Graduates from the Academy have come from in excess of 50 countries across programmes offered in Music Therapy, Contemporary Dance Performance, Irish Traditional Dance Performance, Community Music, Festive Arts, Irish Traditional Music Performance, Classical String Performance, Ethnomusicology, Ethnochoreology, Ritual Chant and Song, and others - several the first of their kind in the world.

In 1995 he was central to the relocation and professionalisation of the Irish Chamber Orchestra from their Dublin Base to the Irish World Academy on the University of Limerick campus. In 2014 he established the aerial dance company Fidget Feet as Artists in Residence at the Academy, which led to them relocating permanently to Limerick City. In 2008 a specially designed building costing 21 million euros and comprising 3000 square meters was opened on the University of Limerick Campus to house the Irish World Academy. The spectacular building sits on the banks of the river Shannon (itself a major influence in the philosophy of the Academy) in a wooded area on the university campus. The innovative nature of Ó Súilleabháin's educational and artistic vision attracted the international philanthropic organisation The Atlantic Philanthropies (TAP) along with the personal interest of Chuck Feeney, TAP's originator.

He died in 2018, as the result of a lengthy illness.

Discography
Mícheál Ó Súilleabháin, 1976 (1990), Gael-Linn.
 Oró Damhnaigh, 1976, Gael Linn cCy of the Mountain, 1982 (2012) Gael Linn
The Dolphin’s Way, 1987, Virgin Records Ltd.
Oilean/Island (1989)
Enlightenment with Van Morrison (1990)
Casadh/Turning (1991)
Gaiseadh/Flowing (1992)
Between Worlds (1995)
Lumen (1995)
Becoming (1998)
Templum (2001)
 Irish Destiny (DVD 2004) Elver Gleams (2010)

References

External links

magazine article

1950 births
2018 deaths
Academics of the University of Limerick
Irish composers
Irish pianists
20th-century Irish people
21st-century Irish people
People from Clonmel